Makhansingh Solanki (born 1 March 1952 Village Than, Badwani district) is an Indian politician, belonging to Bhartiya Janata Party. In the 2009 election he was elected to the  15th Lok Sabha from the Khargone Lok Sabha constituency of Madhya Pradesh.

He is a political and social worker. He resides at Badwani.

References

External links
 Fifteenth Lok Sabha Members Bioprofile in Lok Sahba website

India MPs 2009–2014
1952 births
Living people
People from Barwani
People from Khargone district
Bharatiya Janata Party politicians from Madhya Pradesh
Lok Sabha members from Madhya Pradesh